Johann Sebastian Bach (28 July 1750) was a German composer and musician of the late Baroque period. He is known for his orchestral music such as the Brandenburg Concertos; instrumental compositions such as the Cello Suites; keyboard works such as the Goldberg Variations and The Well-Tempered Clavier; organ works such as the Schubler Chorales and the Toccata and Fugue in D minor; and vocal music such as the St Matthew Passion and the Mass in B minor. Since the 19th-century Bach revival he has been generally regarded as one of the greatest composers in the history of Western music.

The Bach family already counted several composers when Johann Sebastian was born as the last child of a city musician in Eisenach. After being orphaned at the age of 10, he lived for five years with his eldest brother Johann Christoph, after which he continued his musical education in Lüneburg. From 1703 he was back in Thuringia, working as a musician for Protestant churches in Arnstadt and Mühlhausen and, for longer stretches of time, at courts in Weimar, where he expanded his organ repertory, and Köthen, where he was mostly engaged with chamber music. From 1723 he was employed as Thomaskantor (cantor at St Thomas's) in Leipzig. There he composed music for the principal Lutheran churches of the city, and for its university's student ensemble Collegium Musicum. From 1726 he published some of his keyboard and organ music. In Leipzig, as had happened during some of his earlier positions, he had difficult relations with his employer, a situation that was little remedied when he was granted the title of court composer by his sovereign, Augustus III of Poland, in 1736. In the last decades of his life he reworked and extended many of his earlier compositions. He died of complications after eye surgery in 1750 at the age of 65.

Bach enriched established German styles through his mastery of counterpoint, harmonic, and motivic organisation, and his adaptation of rhythms, forms, and textures from abroad, particularly from Italy and France. Bach's compositions include hundreds of cantatas, both sacred and secular. He composed Latin church music, Passions, oratorios, and motets. He often adopted Lutheran hymns, not only in his larger vocal works, but for instance also in his four-part chorales and his sacred songs. He wrote extensively for organ and for other keyboard instruments. He composed concertos, for instance for violin and for harpsichord, and suites, as chamber music as well as for orchestra. Many of his works employ the genres of canon and fugue.

Throughout the 18th century, Bach was primarily valued as an organist, while his keyboard music, such as The Well-Tempered Clavier, was appreciated for its didactic qualities. The 19th century saw the publication of some major Bach biographies, and by the end of that century all of his known music had been printed. Dissemination of scholarship on the composer continued through periodicals (and later also websites) exclusively devoted to him, and other publications such as the Bach-Werke-Verzeichnis (BWV, a numbered catalogue of his works) and new critical editions of his compositions. His music was further popularised through a multitude of arrangements, including the Air on the G String and "Jesu, Joy of Man's Desiring", and of recordings, such as three different box sets with complete performances of the composer's oeuvre marking the 250th anniversary of his death.

Life

Childhood (1685–1703)

Johann Sebastian Bach was born in Eisenach, the capital of the duchy of Saxe-Eisenach, in present-day Germany, on 21 March 1685 O.S. (31 March 1685 N.S.). He was the eighth and youngest child of Johann Ambrosius Bach, the director of the town musicians, and Maria Elisabeth Lämmerhirt. His father likely taught him violin and basic music theory. His uncles were all professional musicians, whose posts included church organists, court chamber musicians, and composers. One uncle, Johann Christoph Bach, introduced him to the organ, and an older second cousin, Johann Ludwig Bach, was a well-known composer and violinist.

Bach's mother died in 1694, and his father died eight months later. The 10-year-old Bach moved in with his eldest brother, Johann Christoph Bach, the organist at St. Michael's Church in Ohrdruf, Saxe-Gotha-Altenburg. There he studied, performed, and copied music, including his own brother's, despite being forbidden to do so because scores were so valuable and private, and blank ledger paper of that type was costly. He received valuable teaching from his brother, who instructed him on the clavichord. Johann Christoph exposed him to the works of great composers of the day, including South Germans such as Johann Caspar Kerll, Johann Jakob Froberger and Johann Pachelbel (under whom Johann Christoph had studied); North Germans; Frenchmen such as Jean-Baptiste Lully, Louis Marchand and Marin Marais; and even the Italian Girolamo Frescobaldi. During this time, he was also taught theology, Latin and Greek at the local gymnasium.

By 3 April 1700, Bach and his schoolfriend Georg Erdmannwho was two years Bach's elderwere enrolled in the prestigious St. Michael's School in Lüneburg, some two weeks' travel north of Ohrdruf. Their journey was probably undertaken mostly on foot. His two years there were critical in exposing Bach to a wider range of European culture. In addition to singing in the choir, he played the school's three-manual organ and harpsichords. He also came into contact with sons of aristocrats from northern Germany who had been sent to the nearby Ritter-Academie to prepare for careers in other disciplines.

Weimar, Arnstadt, and Mühlhausen (1703–1708)

In January 1703, shortly after graduating from St. Michael's and being turned down for the post of organist at Sangerhausen, Bach was appointed court musician in the chapel of Duke Johann Ernst III in Weimar. His role there is unclear, but it probably included menial, non-musical duties. On 14 August 1703, he became the organist at the New Church, with light duties, a relatively generous salary, and a new organ tuned in a temperament that allowed music written in a wider range of keys to be played.

Despite strong family connections and a musically enthusiastic employer, tension built up between Bach and the authorities after several years in the post. Bach was dissatisfied with the standard of singers in the choir. He called one of them a "Zippel Fagottist" (weenie bassoon player). Late one evening this student, named Geyersbach, went after Bach with a stick. Bach filed a complaint against Geyersbach with the authorities. They acquitted Geyersbach with a minor reprimand and ordered Bach to be more moderate regarding the musical qualities he expected from his students. Some months later Bach upset his employer by a prolonged absence from Arnstadt: after obtaining leave for four weeks, he was absent for around four months in 1705–1706 to visit the organist and composer Dieterich Buxtehude in the northern city of Lübeck. The visit to Buxtehude involved a  journey each way, reportedly on foot.

In 1706, Bach applied for a post as organist at the Blasius Church in Mühlhausen. As part of his application, he had a cantata performed on Easter, 24 April 1707, likely an early version of his . A month later Bach's application was accepted and he took up the post in July. The position included significantly higher remuneration, improved conditions, and a better choir. Four months after arriving at Mühlhausen, Bach married Maria Barbara Bach, his second cousin. Bach was able to convince the church and town government at Mühlhausen to fund an expensive renovation of the organ at the Blasius Church. In 1708 Bach wrote , a festive cantata for the inauguration of the new council, which was published at the council's expense.

Return to Weimar (1708–1717)

Bach left Mühlhausen in 1708, returning to Weimar this time as organist and from 1714  (director of music) at the ducal court, where he had an opportunity to work with a large, well-funded contingent of professional musicians. Bach and his wife moved into a house close to the ducal palace. Later the same year, their first child, Catharina Dorothea, was born, and Maria Barbara's elder, unmarried sister joined them. She remained to help run the household until her death in 1729. Three sons were also born in Weimar: Wilhelm Friedemann, Carl Philipp Emanuel, and Johann Gottfried Bernhard. Johann Sebastian and Maria Barbara had three more children, who however did not live to their first birthday, including twins born in 1713.

Bach's time in Weimar was the start of a sustained period of composing keyboard and orchestral works. He attained the proficiency and confidence to extend the prevailing structures and include influences from abroad. He learned to write dramatic openings and employ the dynamic rhythms and harmonic schemes found in the music of Italians such as Vivaldi, Corelli, and Torelli. Bach absorbed these stylistic aspects in part by transcribing Vivaldi's string and wind concertos for harpsichord and organ; many of these transcribed works are still regularly performed. Bach was particularly attracted to the Italian style, in which one or more solo instruments alternate section-by-section with the full orchestra throughout a movement.

In Weimar, Bach continued to play and compose for the organ and perform concert music with the duke's ensemble. He also began to write the preludes and fugues which were later assembled into his monumental work The Well-Tempered Clavier ("clavier" meaning clavichord or harpsichord), consisting of two books, each containing 24 preludes and fugues in every major and minor key. Bach also started work on the Little Organ Book in Weimar, containing traditional Lutheran chorale tunes set in complex textures. In 1713, Bach was offered a post in Halle when he advised the authorities during a renovation by Christoph Cuntzius of the main organ in the west gallery of the Market Church of Our Dear Lady.

Bach's first Christmas cantata, was premiered in 1714 or 1715.

In 1717, Bach eventually fell out of favour in Weimar and, according to a translation of the court secretary's report, was jailed for almost a month before being unfavourably dismissed: "On November 6, [1717], the quondam [former] concertmaster and organist Bach was confined to the County Judge's place of detention for too stubbornly forcing the issue of his dismissal and finally on December 2 was freed from arrest with notice of his unfavourable discharge."

Köthen (1717–1723)

Leopold, Prince of Anhalt-Köthen, hired Bach to serve as his  (director of music) in 1717. Prince Leopold, himself a musician, appreciated Bach's talents, paid him well and gave him considerable latitude in composing and performing. The prince was a Calvinist and did not use elaborate music in his worship; accordingly, most of Bach's work from this period was secular, including the orchestral suites, cello suites, sonatas and partitas for solo violin, and Brandenburg Concertos.

In 1719, Bach made the  journey from Köthen to Halle with the intention of meeting Handel; however, Handel had left the town. In 1730, Bach's oldest son, Wilhelm Friedemann, travelled to Halle to invite Handel to visit the Bach family in Leipzig, but the visit did not take place.

On 7 July 1720, while Bach was away in Carlsbad with Prince Leopold, Bach's wife suddenly died. The following year, he met Anna Magdalena Wilcke, a young, highly gifted soprano 16 years his junior, who performed at the court in Köthen; they married on 3 December 1721. Together they had 13 children, six of whom survived into adulthood: Gottfried Heinrich; Elisabeth Juliane Friederica (1726–1781); Johann Christoph Friedrich and Johann Christian, who both, especially Johann Christian, became significant musicians; Johanna Carolina (1737–1781); and Regina Susanna (1742–1809).

Leipzig (1723–1750)
In 1723, Bach was appointed Thomaskantor, Cantor of the St. Thomas School at the St. Thomas Church in Leipzig, which provided music for four churches in the city: the St. Thomas Church and St. Nicholas Church and to a lesser extent the New Church and St. Peter's Church. This was "the leading cantorate in Protestant Germany", located in the mercantile city in the Electorate of Saxony, which he held for 27 years until his death. During that time he gained further prestige through honorary appointments at the courts of Köthen and Weissenfels, as well as that of the Elector Frederick Augustus (who was also King of Poland) in Dresden. Bach frequently disagreed with his employer, Leipzig's city council, which he regarded as "penny-pinching".

Appointment in Leipzig

Johann Kuhnau had been Thomaskantor in Leipzig from 1701 until his death on 5 June 1722. Bach had visited Leipzig during Kuhnau's tenure: in 1714 he attended the service at the St. Thomas Church on the first Sunday of Advent, and in 1717 he had tested the organ of the St. Paul's Church. In 1716 Bach and Kuhnau had met on the occasion of the testing and inauguration of an organ in Halle.

After being offered the position, Bach was invited to Leipzig only after Georg Philipp Telemann indicated that he would not be interested in relocating to Leipzig. Telemann went to Hamburg, where he "had his own struggles with the city's senate".

He was also assigned to teach Latin but was allowed to employ four "prefects" (deputies) to do this instead. The prefects also aided with musical instruction. A cantata was required for the church services on Sundays and additional church holidays during the liturgical year.

Cantata cycle years (1723–1729)
Bach usually led performances of his cantatas, most of which were composed within three years of his relocation to Leipzig. Bach collected his cantatas in annual cycles. Five are mentioned in obituaries, three are extant. Of the more than 300 cantatas which Bach composed in Leipzig, over 100 have been lost to posterity. Most of these works expound on the Gospel readings prescribed for every Sunday and feast day in the Lutheran year. Bach started a second annual cycle the first Sunday after Trinity of 1724 and composed only chorale cantatas, each based on a single church hymn.

Bach drew the soprano and alto choristers from the school and the tenors and basses from the school and elsewhere in Leipzig. Performing at weddings and funerals provided extra income for these groups; it was probably for this purpose, and for in-school training, that he wrote at least six motets. As part of his regular church work, he performed other composers' motets, which served as formal models for his own.

Bach's predecessor as cantor, Johann Kuhnau, had also been music director for the St. Paul's Church, the church of Leipzig University. But when Bach was installed as cantor in 1723, he was put in charge only of music for festal (church holiday) services at the St. Paul's Church; his petition to also provide music for regular Sunday services there (for a corresponding salary increase) went all the way to the Elector but was denied. After this, in 1725, Bach "lost interest" in working even for festal services at the St. Paul's Church and appeared there only on "special occasions". The St. Paul's Church had a much better and newer (1716) organ than did the St. Thomas Church or the St. Nicholas Church. Bach was not required to play any organ in his official duties, but it is believed he liked to play on the St. Paul's Church organ "for his own pleasure".

Bach broadened his composing and performing beyond the liturgy by taking over, in March 1729, the directorship of the Collegium Musicum, a secular performance ensemble started by Telemann. This was one of the dozens of private societies in the major German-speaking cities that were established by musically active university students; these societies had become increasingly important in public musical life and were typically led by the most prominent professionals in a city. In the words of Christoph Wolff, assuming the directorship was a shrewd move that "consolidated Bach's firm grip on Leipzig's principal musical institutions". Every week the Collegium Musicum would give two-hour performances in winter at the Café Zimmermann, a coffeehouse on Catherine Street off the main market square; and during the summer months in the proprietor's outdoor coffee garden just outside the town walls, near the East Gate. The concerts, all free of charge, ended with Gottfried Zimmermann's death in 1741. Apart from showcasing his earlier orchestral repertoire such as the Brandenburg Concertos and Orchestral Suites, many of Bach's newly composed or reworked pieces were performed for these venues, including parts of his  (Keyboard Practice), his violin and keyboard concertos and of course the eponymous Coffee Cantata.

Middle years of the Leipzig period (1730–1739)

In 1733, Bach composed a Kyrie–Gloria Mass in B minor which he later incorporated in his Mass in B minor. He presented the manuscript to the Elector in an eventually successful bid to persuade the prince to give him the title of Court Composer. Bach's appointment as Court Composer was an element of his long-term struggle to achieve greater bargaining power with the Leipzig council. Between 1737 and 1739, Bach's former pupil Carl Gotthelf Gerlach held the directorship of the Collegium Musicum.

In 1735 Bach started to prepare his first publication of organ music, which was printed as the third Clavier-Übung in 1739. From around that year he started to compile and compose the set of preludes and fugues for harpsichord that would become his second book of The Well-Tempered Clavier. He received the title of "Royal Court Composer" from Augustus III in 1736.

Final years and death (1740–1750)
From 1740 to 1748 Bach copied, transcribed, expanded or programmed music in an older polyphonic style (stile antico) by, among others, Palestrina (BNB I/P/2), Kerll (BWV 241), Torri (BWV Anh. 30), Bassani (BWV 1081), Gasparini (Missa Canonica) and Caldara (BWV 1082). Bach's own style shifted in the last decade of his life, showing an increased integration of polyphonic structures and canons and other elements of the stile antico. His fourth and last Clavier-Übung volume, the Goldberg Variations, for two-manual harpsichord, contained nine canons and was published in 1741. Throughout this period, Bach also continued to adopt music of contemporaries such as Handel (BNB I/K/2) and Stölzel (BWV 200), and gave many of his own earlier compositions, such as the St Matthew and St John Passions and the Great Eighteen Chorale Preludes, their final revisions. He also programmed and adapted music by composers of a younger generation, including Pergolesi (BWV 1083) and his own students such as Goldberg (BNB I/G/2).

In 1746 Bach was preparing to enter Lorenz Christoph Mizler's . In order to be admitted Bach had to submit a composition, for which he chose his Canonic Variations on "Vom Himmel hoch da komm' ich her", and a portrait, which was painted by Elias Gottlob Haussmann and featured Bach's Canon triplex á 6 Voc. In May 1747, Bach visited the court of King Frederick II of Prussia in Potsdam. The king played a theme for Bach and challenged him to improvise a fugue based on his theme. Bach obliged, playing a three-part fugue on one of Frederick's fortepianos by Gottfried Silbermann, which was a new type of instrument at the time. Upon his return to Leipzig he composed a set of fugues and canons, and a trio sonata, based on the Thema Regium (theme of the king). Within a few weeks this music was published as The Musical Offering and dedicated to Frederick. The Schübler Chorales, a set of six chorale preludes transcribed from cantata movements Bach had composed some two decades earlier, were published within a year. Around the same time, the set of five canonic variations which Bach had submitted when entering Mizler's society in 1747 were also printed.

Two large-scale compositions occupied a central place in Bach's last years. From around 1742 he wrote and revised the various canons and fugues of The Art of Fugue, which he continued to prepare for publication until shortly before his death. After extracting a cantata, BWV 191 from his 1733 Kyrie-Gloria Mass for the Dresden court in the mid-1740s, Bach expanded that setting into his Mass in B minor in the last years of his life. Although the complete mass was never performed during the composer's lifetime, it is considered to be among the greatest choral works in history.

In January 1749, Bach's daughter Elisabeth Juliane Friederica married his pupil Johann Christoph Altnickol. Bach's health was, however, declining. Becoming blind, Bach underwent eye surgery, in March 1750 and again in April, by the British eye surgeon John Taylor, a man widely understood today as a charlatan and believed to have blinded hundreds of people. Bach died on 28 July 1750 from complications due to the unsuccessful treatment.

An inventory drawn up a few months after Bach's death shows that his estate included five harpsichords, two lute-harpsichords, three violins, three violas, two cellos, a viola da gamba, a lute and a spinet, along with 52 "sacred books", including works by Martin Luther and Josephus. The composer's son Carl Philipp Emanuel saw to it that The Art of Fugue, although still unfinished, was published in 1751. Together with one of the composer's former students, Johann Friedrich Agricola, the son also wrote the obituary ("Nekrolog"), which was published in Mizler's , a periodical journal produced by the Society of Musical Sciences, in 1754.

Musical style

From an early age, Bach studied the works of his musical contemporaries of the Baroque period and those of prior generations, and those influences were reflected in his music. Like his contemporaries Handel, Telemann and Vivaldi, Bach composed concertos, suites, recitatives, da capo arias, and four-part choral music and employed basso continuo. Bach's music was harmonically more innovative than his peer composers, employing surprisingly dissonant chords and progressions, often with extensive exploration of harmonic possibilities within one piece.

The hundreds of sacred works Bach created are usually seen as manifesting not just his craft but also a truly devout relationship with God. The Lutheran chorale was the basis of much of his work. In elaborating these hymns into his chorale preludes, he wrote more cogent and tightly integrated works than most, even when they were massive and lengthy. The large-scale structure of every major Bach sacred vocal work is evidence of subtle, elaborate planning to create a religiously and musically powerful expression. For example, the St Matthew Passion, like other works of its kind, illustrated the Passion with Bible text reflected in recitatives, arias, choruses, and chorales, but in crafting this work, Bach created an overall experience that has been found over the intervening centuries to be both musically thrilling and spiritually profound.

Bach published or carefully compiled in manuscript many collections of pieces that explored the range of artistic and technical possibilities inherent in almost every genre of his time except opera. For example, The Well-Tempered Clavier comprises two books, each of which presents a prelude and fugue in every major and minor key, displaying a dizzying variety of structural, contrapuntal and fugal techniques.

Four-part harmony

Four-part harmonies predate Bach, but he lived during a time when modal music in Western tradition was largely supplanted in favour of the tonal system. In this system a piece of music progresses from one chord to the next according to certain rules, each chord being characterised by four notes. The principles of four-part harmony are found not only in Bach's four-part choral music: he also prescribes it for instance for the figured bass accompaniment. The new system was at the core of Bach's style, and his compositions are to a large extent considered as laying down the rules for the evolving scheme that would dominate musical expression in the next centuries. Some examples of this characteristic of Bach's style and its influence:
 When in the 1740s Bach staged his arrangement of Pergolesi's Stabat Mater, he upgraded the viola part (which in the original composition plays in unison with the bass part) to fill out the harmony, thus adapting the composition to his four-part harmony style.
 When, starting in the 19th century in Russia, there was a discussion about the authenticity of four-part court chant settings compared to earlier Russian traditions, Bach's four-part chorale settings, such as those ending his Chorale cantatas, were considered as foreign-influenced models. Such influence was deemed unavoidable, however.

Bach's insistence on the tonal system and contribution to shaping it did not imply he was less at ease with the older modal system and the genres associated with it: more than his contemporaries (who had "moved on" to the tonal system without much exception), Bach often returned to the then-antiquated modi and genres. His Chromatic Fantasia and Fugue, emulating the chromatic fantasia genre as used by earlier composers such as Dowland and Sweelinck in D dorian mode (comparable to D minor in the tonal system), is an example of this.

Modulation
Modulation, or changing key in the course of a piece, is another style characteristic where Bach goes beyond what was usual in his time. Baroque instruments vastly limited modulation possibilities: keyboard instruments, prior to a workable system of temperament, limited the keys that could be modulated to, and wind instruments, especially brass instruments such as trumpets and horns, about a century before they were fitted with valves, were tied to the key of their tuning. Bach pushed the limits: he added "strange tones" in his organ playing, confusing the singing, according to an indictment he had to face in Arnstadt, and Louis Marchand, another early experimenter with modulation, seems to have avoided confrontation with Bach because the latter went further than anyone had done before. In the "Suscepit Israel" of his 1723 Magnificat, he had the trumpets in E-flat play a melody in the enharmonic scale of C minor.

The major development taking place in Bach's time, and to which he contributed in no small way, was a temperament for keyboard instruments that allowed their use in all available keys (12 major and 12 minor) and also modulation without retuning. His Capriccio on the departure of a beloved brother, a very early work, showed a gusto for modulation unlike any contemporary work this composition has been compared to, but the full expansion came with the Well-Tempered Clavier, using all keys, which Bach apparently had been developing since around 1720, the Klavierbüchlein für Wilhelm Friedemann Bach being one of its earliest examples.

Ornamentation

The second page of the Klavierbüchlein für Wilhelm Friedemann Bach is an ornament notation and performance guide that Bach wrote for his eldest son, who was nine years old at the time. Bach was generally quite specific on ornamentation in his compositions (where in his time much of the ornamentation was not written out by composers but rather considered a liberty of the performer), and his ornamentation was often quite elaborate. For instance, the "Aria" of the Goldberg Variations has rich ornamentation in nearly every measure. Bach's dealing with ornamentation can also be seen in a keyboard arrangement he made of Marcello's Oboe Concerto: he added explicit ornamentation, which some centuries later is played by oboists when performing the concerto.

Although Bach did not write any operas, he was not averse to the genre or its ornamented vocal style. In church music, Italian composers had imitated the operatic vocal style in genres such as the Neapolitan mass. In Protestant surroundings, there was more reluctance to adopt such a style for liturgical music. For instance, Kuhnau, Bach's predecessor in Leipzig, had notoriously shunned opera and Italian virtuoso vocal music. Bach was less moved. One of the comments after a performance of his St Matthew Passion was that it all sounded much like opera.

Continuo instruments solos
In concerted playing in Bach's time the basso continuo, consisting of instruments such as organ, viola da gamba or harpsichord, usually had the role of accompaniment, providing the harmonic and rhythmic foundation of a piece. From the late 1720s, Bach had the organ play concertante (i.e. as a soloist) with the orchestra in instrumental cantata movements, a decade before Handel published his first organ concertos. Apart from the 5th Brandenburg Concerto and the Triple Concerto, which already had harpsichord soloists in the 1720s, Bach wrote and arranged his harpsichord concertos in the 1730s, and in his sonatas for viola da gamba and harpsichord neither instrument plays a continuo part: they are treated as equal soloists, far beyond the figured bass. In this sense, Bach played a key role in the development of genres such as the keyboard concerto.

Instrumentation
Bach wrote virtuoso music for specific instruments as well as music independent of instrumentation. For instance, the sonatas and partitas for solo violin are considered the pinnacle of what has been written for this instrument, only within reach of accomplished players. The music fits the instrument, pushing it to the full scale of its possibilities and requiring virtuosity of the player but without bravura. Notwithstanding that the music and the instrument seem inseparable, Bach made transcriptions for other instruments of some pieces of this collection. Similarly, for the cello suites, the virtuoso music seems tailored for the instrument, the best of what is offered for it, yet Bach made an arrangement for lute of one of these suites. The same applies to much of his most virtuoso keyboard music. Bach exploited the capabilities of an instrument to the fullest while keeping the core of such music independent of the instrument on which it is performed.

In this sense, it is no surprise that Bach's music is easily and often performed on instruments it was not necessarily written for, that it is transcribed so often, and that his melodies turn up in unexpected places such as jazz music. Apart from this, Bach left a number of compositions without specified instrumentation: the canons BWV 1072–1078 fall in that category, as well as the bulk of the Musical Offering and the Art of Fugue.

Counterpoint

Another characteristic of Bach's style is his extensive use of counterpoint, as opposed to the homophony used in his four-part Chorale settings, for example. Bach's canons, and especially his fugues, are most characteristic of this style, which Bach did not invent but contributed to so fundamentally that he defined it to a large extent. Fugues are as characteristic to Bach's style as, for instance, the Sonata form is characteristic to the composers of the Classical period.

These strictly contrapuntal compositions, and most of Bach's music in general, are characterised by distinct melodic lines for each of the voices, where the chords formed by the notes sounding at a given point follow the rules of four-part harmony. Johann Nikolaus Forkel, Bach's first biographer, gives this description of this feature of Bach's music, which sets it apart from most other music:

Structure and lyrics
Bach devoted more attention than his contemporaries to the structure of compositions. This can be seen in minor adjustments he made when adapting someone else's composition, such as his earliest version of the "Keiser" St Mark Passion, where he enhances scene transitions, and in the architecture of his own compositions such as his Magnificat and Leipzig Passions. In the last years of his life, Bach revised several of his prior compositions. Often the recasting of such previously composed music in an enhanced structure was the most visible change, as in the Mass in B minor. Bach's known preoccupation with structure led (peaking around the 1970s) to various numerological analyses of his compositions, although many such over-interpretations were later rejected, especially when wandering off into symbolism-ridden hermeneutics.

The librettos, or lyrics, of his vocal compositions played an important role for Bach. He sought collaboration with various text authors for his cantatas and major vocal compositions, possibly writing or adapting such texts himself to make them fit the structure of the composition he was designing when he could not rely on the talents of other text authors. His collaboration with Picander for the St Matthew Passion libretto is best known, but there was a similar process in achieving a multi-layered structure for his St John Passion libretto a few years earlier.

Compositions

The first edition of the catalogue listed 1,080 surviving compositions indisputably composed by Bach.

BWV 1081–1126 were added to the catalogue in the second half of the 20th century, and BWV 1127 and higher are 21st-century additions.

Passions and oratorios 

Bach composed Passions for Good Friday services and oratorios such as the Christmas Oratorio, which is a set of six cantatas for use in the liturgical season of Christmas. Shorter oratorios include the Easter Oratorio and the Ascension Oratorio. With its double choir and orchestra, the St Matthew Passion is one of Bach's most extended works. The St John Passion was the first passion Bach composed during his tenure as Thomaskantor in Leipzig.

Cantatas

According to his obituary, Bach would have composed five year-cycles of sacred cantatas, and additional church cantatas for weddings and funerals, for example. Approximately 200 of these sacred works are extant, an estimated two thirds of the total number of church cantatas he composed. The Bach Digital website lists 50 known secular cantatas by the composer, about half of which are extant or largely reconstructable.

Church cantatas

Bach's cantatas vary greatly in form and instrumentation. Many consist of a large opening chorus followed by one or more recitative-aria pairs for soloists (or duets) and a concluding chorale. The melody of the concluding chorale often appears as a cantus firmus in the opening movement.

Bach's earliest cantatas date from his years in Arnstadt and Mühlhausen. As a whole, the extant early works all show remarkable mastery and skill. Many feature an instrumental opening which display effective use of the limited instrumental forces available to Bach, whether it be in the subdued combination of two recorders and two viola de gamba for BWV 106, or the independent bassoon in BWV 196. Bach's compositional skills are also manifested through his daring harmonies and advanced, unprecedented chord progressions. According to Christoph Wolff, Bach's early cantatas are impressive evidence of how the modest means at his disposal did not restrain the composer in the slightest, and they compare favourably with compositions by the most talented composers from the beginning of the 18th century, such as Krieger, Kuhnau or Zachow.

His first cantata cycle ran from the first Sunday after Trinity of 1723 to Trinity Sunday the next year. For instance, the Visitation cantata , containing the chorale that is known in English as "Jesu, Joy of Man's Desiring", belongs to this first cycle. The cantata cycle of his second year in Leipzig is called the chorale cantata cycle as it consists mainly of works in the chorale cantata format. His third cantata cycle was developed over a period of several years, followed by the Picander cycle of 1728–29.

Only the first three Leipzig cycles are more or less completely extant. Apart from his own work, Bach also performed cantatas by Telemann and by his distant relative Johann Ludwig Bach.

Secular cantatas

Bach also wrote secular cantatas, for instance for members of the royal Polish and prince-electoral Saxonian families (e.g. Trauer-Ode), or other public or private occasions (e.g. Hunting Cantata). The text of these cantatas was occasionally in dialect (e.g. Peasant Cantata) or Italian (e.g. Amore traditore). Many of the secular cantatas were lost, but for some of them the text and occasion are known, for instance when Picander later published their librettos (e.g. BWV Anh. 11–12).

Some of the surviving secular cantatas have a plot involving mythological figures of Greek antiquity (e.g. Der Streit zwischen Phoebus und Pan), and others were almost miniature buffo operas (e.g. Coffee Cantata). Although Bach never expressed any interest in opera, his secular cantatas, or drammi per musica, would have allowed Leipzig audiences, deprived of opera since 1720, to experience musical performances comparable to the royal opera in Dresden. These were not at all "poor or makeshift substitutes for real opera" but spectacles displaying "full mastery of the dramatic genre and the proper pacing of the dialogues."

A cappella music
Bach's a cappella music includes motets and chorale harmonisations.

Motets

Bach's motets (BWV 225–231) are pieces on sacred themes for choir and continuo, with instruments playing colla parte. Several of them were composed for funerals. The motet  (BWV 231) is part of the composite motet  (BWV Anh. 160), other parts of which may be based on work by Telemann.

Chorale harmonisations

Bach wrote hundreds of four-part harmonisations of Lutheran chorales.

Church music in Latin

Bach's church music in Latin includes the Magnificat, four Kyrie–Gloria Masses, and the Mass in B minor.

Magnificat

The first version of Bach's Magnificat dates from 1723, but the work is best known in its D major version of 1733.

Mass in B minor

In 1733 Bach composed a Kyrie–Gloria Mass for the Dresden court. Near the end of his life, around 1748–1749, he expanded this composition into the large-scale Mass in B minor. The work was never performed in full during Bach's lifetime.

Keyboard music
Bach wrote for organ and for stringed keyboard instruments such as harpsichord, clavichord and lute-harpsichord.

Organ works

Bach was best known during his lifetime as an organist, organ consultant, and composer of organ works in both the traditional German free genres (such as preludes, fantasias, and toccatas) and stricter forms (such as chorale preludes and fugues). At a young age, he established a reputation for creativity and ability to integrate foreign styles into his organ works. A decidedly North German influence was exerted by Georg Böhm, with whom Bach came into contact in Lüneburg, and Dieterich Buxtehude, whom the young organist visited in Lübeck in 1704 on an extended leave of absence from his job in Arnstadt. Around this time, Bach copied the works of numerous French and Italian composers to gain insights into their compositional languages, and later arranged violin concertos by Vivaldi and others for organ and harpsichord. During his most productive period (1708–1714) he composed about a dozen pairs of preludes and fugues, five toccatas and fugues, and the Orgelbüchlein or "Little Organ Book", an unfinished collection of 46 short chorale preludes that demonstrate compositional techniques in the setting of chorale tunes. After leaving Weimar, Bach wrote less for organ, although some of his best-known works (the six Organ Sonatas, the German Organ Mass in Clavier-Übung III from 1739, and the Great Eighteen Chorale Preludes, revised late in his life) were composed after leaving Weimar. Bach was extensively engaged later in his life in consulting on organ projects, testing new organs and dedicating organs in afternoon recitals. The Canonic Variations on "Vom Himmel hoch da komm' ich her" and the Schübler Chorales are organ works Bach published in the last years of his life.

Harpsichord and other stringed keyboard instruments

Bach wrote many works for harpsichord, some of which may also have been played on the clavichord or lute-harpsichord. Some of his larger works, such as Clavier-Übung II and IV, are intended for a harpsichord with two manuals: performing them on a keyboard instrument with a single manual (like a piano) may present technical difficulties for the crossing of hands.
 The Well-Tempered Clavier, Books 1 and 2 (BWV 846–893). Each book consists of a prelude and fugue in each of the 24 major and minor keys, in chromatic order from C major to B minor (thus, the whole collection is often referred to as "the 48"). "Well-tempered" in the title refers to the temperament (system of tuning); many temperaments before Bach's time were not flexible enough to allow compositions to utilise more than just a few keys.
 The Inventions and Sinfonias (BWV 772–801). These short two- and three-part contrapuntal works are arranged in the same chromatic order as The Well-Tempered Clavier, omitting some of the rarer keys. These pieces were intended by Bach for instructional purposes.
 Three collections of dance suites: the English Suites (BWV 806–811), French Suites (BWV 812–817), and Partitas for keyboard (BWV 825–830). Each collection contains six suites built on the standard model (–––(optional movement)–). The partitas expand the model further with elaborate introductory movements and miscellaneous movements between the basic elements of the model.
 The Goldberg Variations (BWV 988), an aria with 30 variations. The collection has a complex and unconventional structure: the variations build on the bass line of the aria rather than its melody, and musical canons are interpolated according to a grand plan. There are 9 canons within the 30 variations; every third variation is a canon. These variations move in order from canon at unison to canon at the ninth. The first eight are in pairs (unison and octave, second and seventh, third and sixth, fourth and fifth). The ninth canon stands on its own due to compositional dissimilarities. The final variation, instead of being the expected canon at the tenth, is a quodlibet.
 Miscellaneous pieces such as the Overture in the French Style (French Overture, BWV 831) and the Italian Concerto (BWV 971) (published together as ), and the Chromatic Fantasia and Fugue (BWV 903).

Orchestral and chamber music

Bach wrote for single instruments, duets, and small ensembles. Many of his solo works, such as the six sonatas and partitas for violin (BWV 1001–1006) and the six cello suites (BWV 1007–1012), are widely considered to be among the most profound in the repertoire. He wrote sonatas for a solo instrument such as the viola de gamba accompanied by harpsichord or continuo, as well as trio sonatas (two instruments and continuo).

The Musical Offering and The Art of Fugue are late contrapuntal works containing pieces for unspecified instruments or combinations of instruments.

Violin concertos
Surviving works in the concerto form include two violin concertos (BWV 1041 in A minor and BWV 1042 in E major) and a concerto for two violins in D minor, BWV 1043, often referred to as Bach's "double concerto".

Brandenburg Concertos

Bach's best-known orchestral works are the Brandenburg Concertos, so named because he submitted them in the hope of gaining employment from Margrave Christian Ludwig of Brandenburg-Schwedt in 1721; his application was unsuccessful. These works are examples of the concerto grosso genre.

Keyboard concertos

Bach composed and transcribed concertos for one to four harpsichords. Many of the harpsichord concertos were not original works but arrangements of his concertos for other instruments, now lost. A number of violin, oboe, and flute concertos have been reconstructed from these.

Orchestral suites

In addition to concertos, Bach wrote four orchestral suites, each suite being a series of stylised dances for orchestra, preceded by a French overture.

Copies, arrangements and uncertain attributions

In his early youth, Bach copied pieces by other composers to learn from them. Later, he copied and arranged music for performance or as study material for his pupils. Some of these pieces, like "Bist du bei mir" (copied not by Bach but by Anna Magdalena), became famous before being dissociated with Bach. Bach copied and arranged Italian masters such as Vivaldi (e.g. BWV 1065), Pergolesi (BWV 1083) and Palestrina (Missa Sine nomine), French masters such as François Couperin (BWV Anh. 183), and, closer to home, various German masters including Telemann (e.g. BWV 824=TWV 32:14) and Handel (arias from Brockes Passion), and music from members of his own family. He also often copied and arranged his own music (e.g. movements from cantatas for his short masses BWV 233–236), as his music was likewise copied and arranged by others. Some of these arrangements, like the late 19th-century "Air on the G String", helped to popularise Bach's music.

Sometimes "who copied whom" is not clear. For instance, Forkel mentions a Mass for double chorus among the works composed by Bach. The work was published and performed in the early 19th century, and although a score partially in Bach's handwriting exists, the work was later considered spurious. In 1950, the design of the Bach-Werke-Verzeichnis was to keep such works out of the main catalogue: if there was a strong association with Bach they could be listed in its appendix (German: Anhang, abbreviated as Anh.). Thus, for instance, the aforementioned Mass for double chorus became BWV Anh. 167. But this was far from the end of the attribution issues. For instance, Schlage doch, gewünschte Stunde, BWV 53, was later attributed to Melchior Hoffmann. For other works, Bach's authorship was put in doubt without a generally accepted answer to the question of whether or not he composed it: the best known organ composition in the BWV catalogue, the Toccata and Fugue in D minor, BWV 565, was indicated as one of these uncertain works in the late 20th century.

Reception

Throughout the 18th century, the appreciation of Bach's music was mostly limited to distinguished connoisseurs. The 19th century started with publication of the first biography of the composer and ended with the completion of the publication of all of Bach's known works by the Bach Gesellschaft. A Bach Revival had started from Mendelssohn's performance of the St Matthew Passion in 1829. Soon after that performance, Bach started to become regarded as one of the greatest composers of all time, if not the greatest, a reputation he has retained ever since. A new extensive Bach biography was published in the second half of the 19th century.

In the 20th century Bach's music was widely performed and recorded, while the Neue Bachgesellschaft, among others, published research on the composer. Modern adaptations of Bach's music contributed greatly to his popularisation in the second half of the 20th century.

By the end of the 20th century, more classical performers were gradually moving away from the performance style and instrumentation that were established in the romantic era: they started to perform Bach's music on period instruments of the baroque era, studied and practised playing techniques and tempi as established in his time, and reduced the size of instrumental ensembles and choirs to what he would have employed. The BACH motif, used by the composer in his own compositions, was used in dozens of tributes to the composer from the 19th century to the 21st. In the 21st century the complete extant output of the composer became available online, with several websites exclusively dedicated to him.

The liturgical calendar of the Episcopal Church remembers Bach annually with a feast day on 28 July on the same day, the Calendar of Saints of some Lutheran churches, such as the ELCA, remembers Bach and Handel with Heinrich Schütz.

18th century

In his own time, Bach was highly regarded amongst his colleagues, although his reputation outside of this small circle of connoisseurs was due not to his compositions (which had an extremely narrow circulation), but due to his virtuosic abilities. Nevertheless, during his life, Bach received public recognition, such as the title of court composer by Augustus III of Poland and the appreciation he was shown by Frederick the Great and Hermann Karl von Keyserling. Such highly placed appreciation contrasted with the humiliations he had to cope with, for instance in Leipzig. Also in the contemporary press, Bach had his detractors, such as Johann Adolf Scheibe, suggesting he write less complex music, and his supporters, such as Johann Mattheson and Lorenz Christoph Mizler.

After his death, Bach's reputation as a composer at first declined: his work was regarded as old-fashioned compared to the emerging galant style. Initially, he was remembered more as a virtuoso player of the organ and as a teacher. The bulk of the music that had been printed during the composer's lifetime, at least the part that was remembered, was for the organ and the harpsichord. Thus, his reputation as a composer was initially mostly limited to his keyboard music, and that even fairly limited to its value in music education.

Bach's surviving family members, who inherited a large part of his manuscripts, were not all equally concerned with preserving them, leading to considerable losses. Carl Philipp Emanuel, his second eldest son, was most active in safeguarding his father's legacy: he co-authored his father's obituary, contributed to the publication of his four-part chorales, staged some of his works, and the bulk of previously unpublished works of his father were preserved with his help. Wilhelm Friedemann, the eldest son, performed several of his father's cantatas in Halle but after becoming unemployed sold part of the large collection of his father's works he owned. Several students of the old master, such as his son-in-law Johann Christoph Altnickol, Johann Friedrich Agricola, Johann Kirnberger, and Johann Ludwig Krebs, contributed to the dissemination of his legacy. The early devotees were not all musicians; for example, in Berlin, Daniel Itzig, a high official of Frederick the Great's court, venerated Bach. His eldest daughters took lessons from Kirnberger and their sister Sara from Wilhelm Friedemann Bach, who was in Berlin from 1774 to 1784. Sara Itzig Levy became an avid collector of works by Johann Sebastian Bach and his sons and was a "patron" of CPE Bach.

While in Leipzig, performances of Bach's church music were limited to some of his motets, and under cantor Doles some of his Passions. A new generation of Bach aficionados emerged: they studiously collected and copied his music, including some of his large-scale works such as the Mass in B minor and performed it privately. One such connoisseur was Gottfried van Swieten, a high-ranking Austrian official who was instrumental in passing Bach's legacy on to the composers of the Viennese school. Haydn owned manuscript copies of the Well-Tempered Clavier and the Mass in B minor and was influenced by Bach's music. Mozart owned a copy of one of Bach's motets, transcribed some of his instrumental works (K. 404a, 405), and wrote contrapuntal music influenced by his style.

19th century

In 1802, Johann Nikolaus Forkel published Ueber Johann Sebastian Bachs Leben, Kunst und Kunstwerke, the first biography of the composer, which contributed to his becoming known to a wider public. In 1805, Abraham Mendelssohn, who had married one of Itzig's granddaughters, bought a substantial collection of Bach manuscripts that had come down from C. P. E. Bach, and donated it to the Berlin Sing-Akademie. The Sing-Akademie occasionally performed Bach's works in public concerts, for instance his first keyboard concerto, with Sara Itzig Levy at the piano.

The first decades of the 19th century saw an increasing number of first publications of Bach's music: Breitkopf started publishing chorale preludes, Hoffmeister harpsichord music, and the Well-Tempered Clavier was printed concurrently by Simrock (Germany), Nägeli (Switzerland) and Hoffmeister (Germany and Austria) in 1801. Vocal music was also published: motets in 1802 and 1803, followed by the E major version of the Magnificat, the Kyrie-Gloria Mass in A major, and the cantata Ein feste Burg ist unser Gott (BWV 80). In 1818, Hans Georg Nägeli called the Mass in B minor the greatest composition ever. Bach's influence was felt in the next generation of early Romantic composers. When Felix Mendelssohn, Abraham's son, aged 13, produced his first Magnificat setting in 1822, it is clear that he had been inspired by the then unpublished D major version of Bach's Magnificat.

Felix Mendelssohn significantly contributed to the renewed interest in Bach's work with his 1829 Berlin performance of the St Matthew Passion, which was instrumental in setting off what has been called the Bach Revival. The St John Passion saw its 19th-century premiere in 1833, and the first performance of the Mass in B minor followed in 1844. Besides these and other public performances and an increased coverage on the composer and his compositions in printed media, the 1830s and 1840s also saw the first publication of more vocal works by Bach: six cantatas, the St Matthew Passion, and the Mass in B minor. A series of organ compositions saw their first publication in 1833. Chopin started composing his 24 Preludes, Op. 28, inspired by the Well-Tempered Clavier, in 1835, and Schumann published his Sechs Fugen über den Namen B-A-C-H in 1845. Bach's music was transcribed and arranged to suit contemporary tastes and performance practice by composers such as Carl Friedrich Zelter, Robert Franz, and Franz Liszt, or combined with new music such as the melody line of Charles Gounod's Ave Maria. Brahms, Bruckner, and Wagner were among the composers who promoted Bach's music or wrote glowingly about it.

In the second half of the 19th century, the Society published a comprehensive edition of the composer's works. Also in the second half of the 19th century, Philipp Spitta published Johann Sebastian Bach, the standard work on Bach's life and music. By that time, Bach was known as the first of the three Bs in music. Throughout the 19th century, 200 books were published on Bach. By the end of the century, local Bach societies were established in several cities, and his music had been performed in all major musical centres.

In Germany all throughout the century, Bach was coupled to nationalist feelings, and the composer was inscribed in a religious revival. In England, Bach was coupled to an existing revival of religious and baroque music. By the end of the century, Bach was firmly established as one of the greatest composers, recognised for both his instrumental and his vocal music.

20th century

During the 20th century, the process of recognising the musical as well as the pedagogic value of some of the works continued, as in the promotion of the cello suites by Pablo Casals, the first major performer to record these suites. Leading performers of classical music such as Willem Mengelberg, Edwin Fischer, Georges Enescu, Leopold Stokowski, Herbert von Karajan, Arthur Grumiaux, Helmut Walcha, Wanda Landowska, Karl Richter, I Musici, Dietrich Fischer-Dieskau, and Glenn Gould recorded his music.

A significant development in the later part of the 20th century was the momentum gained by the historically informed performance practice, with forerunners such as Nikolaus Harnoncourt acquiring prominence by their performances of Bach's music. His keyboard music was again performed more on the instruments Bach was familiar with, rather than on modern pianos and 19th-century romantic organs. Ensembles playing and singing Bach's music not only kept to the instruments and the performance style of his day but were also reduced to the size of the groups Bach used for his performances. But that was far from the only way Bach's music came to the forefront in the 20th century: his music was heard in versions ranging from Ferruccio Busoni's late romantic piano transcriptions to jazzy interpretations such as those by The Swingle Singers, orchestrations like the one opening Walt Disney's Fantasia movie, and synthesiser performances such as Wendy Carlos' Switched-On Bach recordings.

Bach's music has influenced other genres. For instance, jazz musicians have adopted Bach's music, with Jacques Loussier, Ian Anderson, Uri Caine, and the Modern Jazz Quartet among those creating jazz versions of his works. Several 20th-century composers referred to Bach or his music, for example Eugène Ysaÿe in Six Sonatas for solo violin, Dmitri Shostakovich in 24 Preludes and Fugues and Heitor Villa-Lobos in Bachianas Brasileiras. All kinds of publications involved Bach: not only were there the Bach Jahrbuch publications of the Neue Bachgesellschaft, various other biographies and studies by among others Albert Schweitzer, Charles Sanford Terry, Alfred Dürr, Christoph Wolff. Peter Williams, John Butt, and the 1950 first edition of the Bach-Werke-Verzeichnis; but also books such as Gödel, Escher, Bach put the composer's art in a wider perspective. Bach's music was extensively listened to, performed, broadcast, arranged, adapted, and commented upon in the 1990s. Around 2000, the 250th anniversary of Bach's death, three record companies issued box sets with complete recordings of Bach's music.

Bach's music features three timesmore than that of any other composeron the Voyager Golden Record, a gramophone record containing a broad sample of the images, common sounds, languages, and music of Earth, sent into outer space with the two Voyager probes. Tributes to Bach in the 20th century include statues erected in his honour and a variety of things such as streets and space objects being named after him. Also, a multitude of musical ensembles such as the Bach Aria Group, Deutsche Bachsolisten, Bachchor Stuttgart, and Bach Collegium Japan adopted the composer's name. Bach festivals were held on several continents, and competitions and prizes such as the International Johann Sebastian Bach Competition and the Royal Academy of Music Bach Prize were named after the composer. While by the end of the 19th century Bach had been inscribed in nationalism and religious revival, the late 20th century saw Bach as the subject of a secularised art-as-religion.

21st century
In the 21st century, Bach's compositions have become available online, for instance at the International Music Score Library Project. High-resolution facsimiles of Bach's autographs became available at the Bach Digital website. 21st-century biographers include Christoph Wolff, Peter Williams and John Eliot Gardiner.

In 2015, Bach's handwritten personal copy of his Mass in B minor, held by the Berlin State Library, was added to UNESCO's Memory of the World Register, a program intended to protect culturally significant manuscripts.

In 2019, Bach was named the greatest composer of all time in a poll conducted among 174 living composers.

Burial site
Bach was originally buried at Old St. John's Cemetery in Leipzig. His grave went unmarked for nearly 150 years, but in 1894 his remains were located and moved to a vault in St. John's Church. This building was destroyed by Allied bombing during World War II, so in 1950 Bach's remains were taken to their present grave in St. Thomas Church. Later research has called into question whether the remains in the grave are actually those of Bach.

See also
Portraits of Johann Sebastian Bach

References

Notes

Citations

Works cited

Biographies

 
 
 
 
 
  
 
 
 , first published in French in 1905 and in German in 1908.(Vol. 1, Vol. 2)

Other

 
 
 
 
  
 
 

 
 
 
 
 
 

 
 
 
 
 
 
 
 
 
 ;

Further reading

 
  N.B.: First published in 1867; superseded, for scholarly purposes, by Wolfgang Schmieder's complete thematic catalog, but useful as a handy reference tool for only the instrumental works of Bach and as a partial alternative to Schmieder's work.

External links

 
 bach-leipzig website of the Bach Archive.
 Yo Tomita's Bach Bibliography (23 March 2012), mirror at the Riemenschneider Bach Institute.
 .

Scores

 .
 .
 Music manuscripts and early prints at Bach Digital website.

Recordings

 Johann Sebastian Bach recordings at the Discography of American Historical Recordings.
 .
 All of Bach website of the Netherlands Bach Society.

 
1685 births
1750 deaths
18th-century classical composers
18th-century German composers
18th-century German male musicians
18th-century keyboardists
Articles containing video clips
Johann Sebastian Bach
German blind people
Burials at St. Thomas Church, Leipzig
Classical composers of church music
Composers for pipe organ
Composers for harpsichord
German Baroque composers
German classical composers
German classical organists
German Lutherans
German male classical composers
German male organists
Male classical organists
Musicians from Leipzig
Oratorio composers
Organ improvisers
Organists and composers in the North German tradition
People celebrated in the Lutheran liturgical calendar
People from Eisenach
People from Saxe-Eisenach
Thomaskantors
Deaths from surgical complications